This is a list of Maltese football transfers in the summer transfer window 2008 by club. Only transfers of the Maltese Premier League are included.

The summer transfer window opened on July 1, 2008, and closed on September 1, 2008. Deals may be signed at any given moment during the season, but the actual transfer may only take place during the transfer window.

Maltese Premier League

Birkirkara

In:

Out:

Floriana

In:

Out:

Ħamrun Spartans

In:

Out:

Hibernians

In:

Out:

Marsaxlokk

In:

Out:

Msida Saint-Joseph

In:

Out:

Qormi

In:

Out:

Sliema Wanderers

In:

Out:

Tarxien Rainbows

In:

Out:

Valletta

In:

Out:

See also
 List of Belgian football transfers summer 2008
 List of Danish football transfers summer 2008
 List of Dutch football transfers summer 2008
 List of English football transfers summer 2008
 List of German football transfers summer 2008
 List of Greek football transfers 2008-09
 List of Italian football transfers summer 2008: July/August
 List of Scottish football transfers 2008-09
 List of Spanish football transfers summer 2008
 List of Turkish football transfers 2008-09

References

External links
 Official Website

Maltese
Transfers Summer 2008
2008